José González (born 6 October 1977) is a Puerto Rican swimmer. He competed in two events at the 1996 Summer Olympics.

References

1977 births
Living people
Puerto Rican male swimmers
Olympic swimmers of Puerto Rico
Swimmers at the 1996 Summer Olympics
Place of birth missing (living people)